The following is a list of the Latin empresses consort of Constantinople. Yolanda of Flanders and Marie of Brienne were not only empresses consort but also empresses regent. Catherine I and Catherine II were empresses regnant, not empresses consort.

Latin Empresses consort of Constantinople

Latin Empresses consort of Constantinople in exile
Beatrice of Sicily (1273–1275)
Marie de Bourbon (1347–1364)
Maria of Calabria (1364–1366)
Elizabeth of Slavonia (1370–1374)
Agnes of Durazzo (1382—1383)

See also
Latin Emperor
List of Roman and Byzantine empresses
List of exiled and pretending Byzantine Empresses
List of Queens of Jerusalem
List of Queens of Cyprus
Princess of Antioch
Princess of Achaea

References

External links
Latin Emperors

Emp
Latin